Sir Henry Seymour, 1st Baronet  (20 October 1674 – April 1714), of Langley, Buckinghamshire, was an English landowner and Tory politician who sat in the English and British House of Commons from 1699 to 1713.

Seymour was the second son of Henry Seymour, of Langley, Buckinghamshire  Groom of the Bedchamber, and his second wife Ursula Austen, daughter of Sir Robert Austen, 1st Baronet,  and widow of George Stawale. He was the paternal grandson of Sir Edward Seymour, 2nd Baronet, and wife Dorothy Killegrew.  He was created 1st Baronet Seymour, of Langley, at the age of seven on 4 July 1681. His father died on 9 March 1687, and he inherited Langley Park and his father's reversionary grant of the clerkship of the hanaper office. From 1693 he travelled abroad for three years.

Seymour was returned unopposed as Tory Member of Parliament for East Looe at a by-election on 17 January 1699 in the interest of his cousin Bishop Trelawny of Exeter. He was returned again unopposed at the two general elections of 1701 and in 1702 and 1705. He voted against the Court candidate for Speaker on 25 October 1705. Returned again at the 1708 British general election, he  voted against the impeachment of Dr Sacheverell in 1710. He was returned again at the 1710 British general election. He was one of the ‘worthy patriots’ who  detected the mismanagements of the previous administration and a member of the October Club. He stood down at the 1713 British general election, probably through ill=health.
 
Seymour died unmarried and without issue  in London in April 1714.   Langley Park, Buckinghamshire  was sold in 1714 to Samuel Masham, 1st Baron Masham.

References

1674 births
1714 deaths
Baronets in the Baronetage of England
British MPs 1707–1708
British MPs 1708–1710
British MPs 1710–1713
Members of the pre-1707 English Parliament for constituencies in Cornwall
Members of the Parliament of Great Britain for constituencies in Cornwall
Members of the Parliament of Great Britain for English constituencies
Henry Seymour, 1st Baronet
English MPs 1698–1700
English MPs 1701
English MPs 1701–1702
English MPs 1702–1705
English MPs 1705–1707